Ashville is a city in and one of the county seats of St. Clair County, Alabama, United States, other seat being Pell City. Its population was 2,212 at the 2010 census, down from 2,260, at which time it was a town. It incorporated in 1822.

History
Ashville was initially founded as the community of St. Clairsville, but the name was changed to honor John Ash, the first white settler of the area who arrived in 1817. He became the first county judge and later state senator. His log cabin stands in the city center. Philip Coleman originally owned the land on which the town stands, but he sold 30 acres to the five county commissioners, which included Ash, who was appointed by Gov. Thomas Bibb to establish a new county seat for St. Clair. It was designated the county seat in 1821 and the village incorporated in 1822. The first courthouse, also a log structure, was built two years later. It was replaced in 1844 with the current courthouse building.

In 1890, a group of investors organized the Tennessee River, Ashville and Coosa Railroad Company, and planned to build a railroad line from Sheffield to Anniston via Ashville. It managed to build to Ashville from Whitney, connecting the town to the Alabama Great Southern Railroad. However, it went bankrupt during the mid-1890s, and the tracks were dismantled and sold for scrap.

Electric lights came to Ashville in 1891, and the first telephone company was chartered in the same year. Residents in the southern half of the county often complained of the difficulty of traveling to Ashville over Backbone Mountain, which divides the county, so the state legislature authorized a satellite county seat to be established in Pell City in 1907 on the southern side of the mountain.

Geography
Ashville is located at  (33.843737, -86.266274).

Climate
The climate in this area is characterized by hot, humid summers and generally mild to cool winters. According to the Köppen climate classification system, Ashville has a humid subtropical climate, abbreviated "Cfa" on climate maps.

Demographics

Ashville

Ashville first appeared on the 1860 U.S. Census as an incorporated town. It would not appear again on the census as a town until 1900. See also precinct below.

2000 Census data
As of the census of 2000, there were 2,260 people, 814 households, and 608 families residing in the town. The racial makeup of the town was 69.42% White, 26.55% Black or African American, 0.18% Native American, 0.18% Asian, 0.31% Pacific Islander, 1.81% from other races, and 1.55% from two or more races. 2.88% of the population were Hispanic or Latino of any race.

There were 814 households, out of which 37.0% had children under the age of 18 living with them, 56.6% were married couples living together, 14.1% had a female householder with no husband present, and 25.2% were non-families. 22.7% of all households were made up of individuals, and 11.2% had someone living alone who was 65 years of age or older. The average household size was 2.64 and the average family size was 3.10.

In the town the population was spread out, with 25.7% under the age of 18, 8.9% from 18 to 24, 28.2% from 25 to 44, 23.2% from 45 to 64, and 14.0% who were 65 years of age or older. The median age was 36 years. For every 100 females, there were 102.3 males. For every 100 females age 18 and over, there were 100.1 males.

The median income for a household in the town was $31,509, and the median income for a family was $38,355. Males had a median income of $31,081 versus $21,914 for females. The per capita income for the town was $15,867. About 11.4% of families and 15.1% of the population were below the poverty line, including 14.1% of those under age 18 and 18.3% of those age 65 or over.

2010 census
As of the census of 2010, there were 2,212 people, 793 households, and 597 families residing in the town. The racial makeup of the town was 75.8% White, 20.3% Black or African American, 0.2% Native American, 03% Asian, 0% Pacific Islander, 1.4% from other races, and 2.0% from two or more races. 3.8% of the population were Hispanic or Latino of any race.

There were 793 households, out of which 29.6% had children under the age of 18 living with them, 54.9% were married couples living together, 16.6% had a female householder with no husband present, and 24.7% were non-families. 21.8% of all households were made up of individuals, and 9.0% had someone living alone who was 65 years of age or older. The average household size was 2.68 and the average family size was 3.12.

In the town the population was spread out, with 24.0% under the age of 18, 10.0% from 18 to 24, 25.9% from 25 to 44, 26.9% from 45 to 64, and 13.3% who were 65 years of age or older. The median age was 37.3 years. For every 100 females, there were 99.6 males. For every 100 females age 18 and over, there were 100.3 males.

The median income for a household in the town was $33,321, and the median income for a family was $34,607. Males had a median income of $32,026 versus $30,033 for females. The per capita income for the town was $16,419. About 14.2% of families and 19.9% of the population were below the poverty line, including 32.0% of those under age 18 and 6.2% of those age 65 or over.

2020 census

As of the 2020 United States census, there were 2,346 people, 778 households, and 584 families residing in the city.

Ashville Precinct/Division

The Ashville Beat (St. Clair County 1st Beat) first appeared on the 1870 U.S. Census. In 1890, "beat" was changed to "precinct." In 1960, the precinct was changed to "census division" as part of a general reorganization of counties.

April 27, 2011 tornado
On the evening of April 27, 2011, an EF-4 tornado ripped through the Shoal Creek Valley community south of Ashville, killing 13 people. The tornado also destroyed hundreds of thousands of dollars' worth of property including homes, livestock, timberland, and farm equipment. Rescuers from neighboring communities immediately responded after the twister swept through the valley; however, due to the abundance of fallen timber blocking the roads and the remoteness of the community, many victims were forced to wait hours before aid could arrive. Following the devastation, then-Governor Robert Bentley visited the community along with officials from the Alabama Emergency Management Agency and the Federal Emergency Management Agency. The community received both federal and state disaster aid for several weeks following the destructive tornado.

Education
St. Clair County School System
Ashville Elementary School
Principal: Shane Parker
Guidance Counselor: Summer Burke
Ashville Middle School
 Principal: Rusty St. John
Assistant Principal: TBA
Guidance Counselor: Kerry Montgomery 
Ashville High School
Principal: Janet Johnson
Assistant Principal: TBA
Guidance Counselor: TBA
Mascot: Bulldogs - School Colors: Kelly Green, White, and Orange

Notable people
 Rufus W. Cobb, Governor of Alabama from 1878–1882
 John Grass, Ashville High School: c/o 1985, head football coach for Jacksonville State University
 Howard Hill, Hollywood archer, called "The World's Greatest Archer," winning 196 field archery competitions. Also stunt double for actor Errol Flynn. Buried in Ashville

See also
Confederate Monument (Ashville, Alabama)

Photo Gallery

References

External links
 City website

Cities in St. Clair County, Alabama
Cities in Alabama
County seats in Alabama
Birmingham metropolitan area, Alabama